The World Court League was formed on December 30, 1915, with John Hays Hammond as president.  They lobbied for the formation of the International Court of Justice.

1915 personnel and first meeting attendees
William H. Taft, honorary president. He resigned in 1917 because he was a member of the League to Enforce Peace.
John Hays Hammond, president.
Emerson McMillin, vice president.
Henry Clews, treasurer.
Dr. John Wesley Hill, general secretary and editor of The World Court
Jeremiah Whipple Jenks, attendee.
W. E. Knox of New York City, New York, director.
Oscar S. Strauss, attendee.
W. W. Wilson of Chicago, Illinois, director.
Augustus Busch of St. Louis, Missouri, director.
Alton Brooks Parker, director.
James G. Beemer, attendee.
Samuel C. Dutton of Hartsdale, New York, attendee.
E. C. Stokes of Trenton, New Jersey, director.

1917 personnel
Samuel T. Dutton, general secretary, 1917

1919 personnel  
Charles Lathrop Pack, president
Nicholas Murray Butler, president of the international council.
Albert Shaw (World's Court League).
Henry Clews, treasurer.
Samuel T. Dutton.
Frederick E. Farnsworth.
Charles Herbert Levermore, corresponding secretary.
Frank Chapin Bray, editor.

Presidents
John Hays Hammond 1914 to 1915.
Charles Lathrop Pack 1919.

References

Organizations established in 1915